Enchantment is a 1920 British silent drama film directed by Einar Bruun and starring Henry Krauss, Mary Odette and Eric Barclay.

Cast
 Henry Krauss as John Desmond 
 Mary Odette as Pat Desmond 
 Eric Barclay as Charles Stuart 
 Edward O'Neill as Sandy Stuart  
 Henry Vibart as Father Casey  
 Mary Brough as Mrs. Slattery  
 George Bellamy as Tim Cassidy  
 Joyce Barbour as Sophie Desmond  
 C. Hargrave Mansell as Dr. O'Connor  
 Caleb Porter as Sailor

References

Bibliography
 Low, Rachael. The History of the British Film 1918-1929. George Allen & Unwin, 1971.

External links
 

1920 films
British drama films
British silent feature films
Films directed by Einar Bruun
1920 drama films
Films set in Ireland
Films based on British novels
British black-and-white films
1920s English-language films
1920s British films
Silent drama films